Robert William Gillespie (October 8, 1919 – November 4, 2001) was an American pitcher in Major League Baseball who played between  and  for the Detroit Tigers (1944), Chicago White Sox (1947–48) and Boston Red Sox (1950). The native of Columbus, Ohio, served in the United States Coast Guard during World War II.

In a four-season career, Gillespie posted a 5–13 record with a 4.73 ERA in 58 pitching appearances, including 23 starts, two complete games, 59 strikeouts, 102 walks, and 202 ⅓ innings of work.

Gillespie died in Winston-Salem, North Carolina at age 82.

References

External links

1919 births
2001 deaths
Baseball players from Columbus, Ohio
Beaumont Exporters players
Boston Red Sox players
Buffalo Bisons (minor league) players
Chicago White Sox players
Dallas Rebels players
Detroit Tigers players
Henderson Oilers players
Major League Baseball pitchers
Reidsville Luckies players
Sacramento Solons players
Winston-Salem Twins players
United States Coast Guard personnel of World War II